Chulymsky District ( is an administrative and municipal district (raion), one of the thirty in Novosibirsk Oblast, Russia. It is located in the center of the oblast. Its administrative center is the town of Chulym. Population: 23,909 (2010 Census);  The population of Chulym accounts for 48.4% of the district's total population.

Titular nationality 
Chulymsky District is named after the Chulyms, a native ethnicity, who are closely related to the Khakas and Tuvans.

Notable residents 

Yegor Ligachyov (1920–2021), Soviet and Russian politician

References

Notes

Sources

Districts of Novosibirsk Oblast